Bishopscourt is a small, wealthy, residential suburb in the Southern Suburbs of Cape Town in the Western Cape, South Africa. It is part of the Cape Town Metropolitan Municipality, created in 2000, which includes the greater Cape Town area.

The suburb includes the official residence of the Archbishop of Cape Town, which is known as Bishopscourt, whence comes the name of the suburb. 

In 2015, it was ranked the sixth richest suburb in South Africa with an average property value of R11 million. The area hosts a large number of foreign consulates and embassies in Cape Town.

Nearby places of interest
 Kirstenbosch National Botanical Garden

References

Suburbs of Cape Town